Longstock is a village and civil parish in Hampshire, England. It lies on the western bank of the River Test, to the north of Stockbridge and to the west of Leckford. The parish has a population of around 450. The parish church, St Mary's, was largely rebuilt in the 1880s.

The parish contains Longstock Park which adjoins the Leckford Estate; both are owned by the John Lewis Partnership.

References

External links

Villages in Hampshire
Test Valley